Sawtooth Mountain is a shield volcano, and part of the polygenetic Indian Heaven Volcanic Field in Washington, United States. It is located midway between Mount St. Helens and Mount Adams, and dates from the Pleistocene and Holocene. Sawtooth Mountain is the third highest point at in this region. The mountain forms a series of welded volcanic rock spires, an eroded remnant of an ancient shield volcano. Sawtooth Mountain is the third highest point in the Indian Heaven Wilderness Area. While Sawtooth Mountain is not the highest, its craggy appearance makes it one of the most namesake peaks in the Indian Heaven Volcanic Field.

Geographical setting
Sawtooth Mountain is the third highest peak the Indian Heaven Wilderness in Washington. On clear days hikers can see views of four nearby volcanoes: Mount Adams, Mount Hood, Mount St. Helens, and Mount Rainier from the Sawtooth Mountain Trail, which skirts the subalpine upper west side of Sawtooth Mountain.
The shield volcano is noted as a series of eroded, volcanic spires. While the mountain is free of snow and ice, snow tends to linger on the summit well into July.

Geology
Sawtooth Mountain is one of the many shield volcanoes topped by cinder cones and spatter cones that make up the Indian Heaven Volcanic Field.

Climbing and recreation
Fishing and hiking destinations in the volcanic field around Sawtooth Mountain include the Indian Heaven Wilderness, which is popular for the high mountain meadows among its volcanic peaks. The Pacific Crest National Scenic Trail passes north/south through the volcanic field and the Indian Heaven Wilderness, which is known for its many lakes and views of four nearby volcanoes: Mount Adams, Mount Hood, Mount St. Helens, and Mount Rainier. It also hugs the densely forested east side of Sawtooth Mountain, and in conjunction with the Sawtooth Mountain Trail, can be hiked in a loop beginning at the Sawtooth Trailhead. Wood Lake is to the west of the peak, and a spur trail (Wood Lake Trail) leaves the Pacific Crest Trail for the lake.  Major trails at Sawtooth Mountain are the Sawtooth Trail, which climbs up and skirts the upper west side of Sawtooth Mountain; and Wood Lake Trail, which descends west from the Pacific Crest Trail to the deep blue Wood Lake. The Pacific Crest Trail skirts the densely forested lower west side of the peak.

The Sawtooth Berry Fields is located north of Sawtooth Mountain, around Surprise Lakes and the Sawtooth Trailhead for the Pacific Crest Trail.

See also
 Cascade Volcanoes
 List of volcanoes in the United States of America
 Indian Heaven Wilderness
 Indian Heaven

References

External links
 Gifford Pinchot National Forest - Indian Heaven Wilderness
 USGS - Indian Heaven Volcanic Field
 SummitPost: Sawtooth Mountain
Indian Heaven Wilderness Overview/Background
 Printable Indian Heaven Wilderness Trail Vicinity Map (PDF 85 K, Adobe Acrobat)

Cascade Range
Shield volcanoes of the United States
Subduction volcanoes
Cascade Volcanoes
Volcanoes of Skamania County, Washington
Volcanoes of Washington (state)
Polygenetic volcanoes
Pleistocene shield volcanoes
Gifford Pinchot National Forest
Cinder cones of the United States